MINE in the context of chemotherapy is an acronym for one of the chemotherapy regimens used for treatment of relapsed or refractory aggressive non-Hodgkin's lymphoma and Hodgkin's lymphoma.

Today this regimen is often combined with monoclonal antibody rituximab. In this case the regimen is called R-MINE or MINE-R.

The [R]-MINE regimen consists of:
 Rituximab - anti-CD20 monoclonal antibody that can kill both normal CD20-expressing B cells and malignant ones;
 Mesna to prevent the development of hemorrhagic cystitis which may otherwise result from ifosfamide administration;
 Ifosfamide - an alkylating antineoplastic agent from oxazafosforine group;
 Mitoxantrone - a synthetic anthracycline analogue (anthraquinone) that is able to intercalate DNA and thus prevent cell division (mitosis);
 Etoposide - a topoisomerase inhibitor.

Dosing regimen

References

Chemotherapy regimens used in lymphoma